Phathalē is a village in the Kyain Seikgyi Township, Kawkareik District, Kayin State of south-eastern part of Myanmar.

References

External links 
"Phathale Map — Satellite Images of Phathale" Maplandia World Gazetteer

Populated places in Kayin State